Simicratea is a monotypic genus of flowering plants belonging to the family Celastraceae. The only species is Simicratea welwitschii.

Its native range is Tropical Africa.

References

Celastraceae
Celastrales genera
Monotypic rosid genera